Petra High School (or Petra) is an independent, co-educational,  school in Bulawayo, Zimbabwe. Petra was founded in 1993.

Petra High School is a member of the Association of Trust Schools (ATS) and the Headmistress is a member of the Conference of Heads of Independent Schools in Zimbabwe (CHISZ). The school offers Cambridge International Exams along with ZIMSEC syllabus.

History
Petra High School was started with 60 pupils in Form One in 1993, using the present Grade One and Two block at Petra Primary School, and an old Lewis Lumber shed as the Office, until later taking over the office in the Primary School Administration Block, used as the sick bay today. Tim Middleton was the first headmaster, joining the school in the third term of 1993.

List of Heads at Petra
 Tim Middleton (1993–2002)
 Ray Pountney
 Christopher Hingley
 Joe Mandikate
 Crispin Eley (2010–2014)
 Heather Wells (2015–2019) promoted to principal (2019-Present)
 Robert Aldridge (2019-Present)

See also

 List of schools in Zimbabwe

References

External links
  Official website
  on the ATS website
 

Private schools in Zimbabwe
Cambridge schools in Zimbabwe
Co-educational schools in Zimbabwe
Day schools in Zimbabwe
High schools in Zimbabwe
Educational institutions established in 1993
1993 establishments in Zimbabwe
Member schools of the Association of Trust Schools
Education in Bulawayo